Asoa or ASOA may refer to:

 Asoa language
 Asoa people
 A Swarm of Angels, an open source film project
 Azerbaijan State Oil Academy, now the Azerbaijan State Oil and Industry University